Maurice LaMarche (born March 30, 1958) is a Canadian voice actor, comedian, and impressionist. He has voiced the Brain in Animaniacs as well as its spin-off Pinky and the Brain, Big Bob in Hey Arnold! (1996–2004), the titular character from Inspector Gadget, and a variety of characters in Futurama. He also voiced Egon Spengler in The Real Ghostbusters and its follow-up Extreme Ghostbusters.

Early life 
LaMarche was born in Toronto, Ontario, Canada, on March 30, 1958, to Guy LaMarche and Linda Bourdon. His family moved to Timmins, Ontario, soon after he was born. LaMarche's childhood was filled with his "own little world of cartoons and sixties television". It was in his second year of high school that he learned of the popularity his talent for mimicry could garner him. This realization came from a coincidental performance in a high school "variety night" when a couple of friends urged him to enter. The act he performed at the variety night was "celebrities as waiters" which he  used until the end of his stand-up career.

One of his neighbors and schoolmates was future comedian, Mike Myers.

Career

Stand-up comedy

At the age of nineteen, LaMarche took his high school act to an open mic night in New York City, performing to a reaction in which, as he describes, "they just totally ignored me". This reaction was coupled with the backlash LaMarche received from fellow Canadian comedians who LaMarche describes as discouraging him from pursuing a career outside of Canada. He returned to Canada, continued to do stand-up, and also started a career in voice work.

Three years later, LaMarche moved to Los Angeles to further his stand-up career. This move, LaMarche says, would always be something he regretted doing instead of moving to New York: "... in retrospect, I thought it was a mistake. I think that a couple of years in New York would have made me a stronger comedian."

Over the next five years, LaMarche's career would gradually progress, playing comedy clubs throughout the US, with several appearances on The Merv Griffin Show and An Evening At The Improv. In spite of such interest, LaMarche believed that, while his impersonations and stage presence were strong, he needed to develop funnier comedy material. Despite being critical of himself, LaMarche was asked to be part of the 1985 HBO production Rodney Dangerfield Hosts the 9th Annual Young Comedians Special, on which also appeared Bob Saget, Rita Rudner, Louie Anderson, Yakov Smirnoff, and the breakout first appearance of Sam Kinison. Although he was received and reviewed favorably, in looking back on his own performance in that special, LaMarche believed he was "probably about five years away from going from being a good comedian to being a great comedian" and being the "only impressionist that actually comes from somewhere".

During his standup career, LaMarche opened for such acts as Rodney Dangerfield, George Carlin, Howie Mandel, David Sanborn, and Donna Summer, usually in the main showrooms of Las Vegas and Atlantic City.

On March 9, 1987, LaMarche's father was murdered, shot to death by a lifelong friend in a Toronto hotel lobby in front of dozens of witnesses. This sent LaMarche into depression and alcoholism for the next two years, effectively stalling his stand-up career. After getting sober on January 20, 1989, LaMarche embarked again into the world of standup comedy in the early part of 1990. As he was regaining lost momentum, his 18-year-old sister was killed in a car accident in September of that year. At this point, though he remained sober, LaMarche decided he just could not do standup comedy anymore. He said, "at that point I just threw up my hands and went, 'Oh, that's it. I don't have any funny left in me. I'm done'".

Voice acting

Early Canadian work
LaMarche's entry into the voiceover industry was in 1980 in Easter Fever and Take Me Up to the Ball Game, two animated Canadian TV specials from Nelvana. He also was a regular voice performer on Toronto's pioneering cult TV hit The All-Night Show, which debuted in September 1980; a continuing feature had the lips of LaMarche inserted into a photograph of a famous person, and having LaMarche imitate that person to deliver a show promo or announcement.  When LaMarche left the show in 1981, a young up-and-coming comic named Jim Carrey was recruited to take his place as a voice actor.

Television 
It took a few years after his 1981 move to Los Angeles for LaMarche to establish himself in the American voiceover industry, which he initially pursued as a side endeavor during his full-time standup comedy career. LaMarche began on Inspector Gadget with that show's second season in 1985, and went on to Dennis the Menace, Popeye and Son and The Real Ghostbusters where he played Egon Spengler. After The Real Ghostbusters, LaMarche became a regular mainstay of the voiceover industry, appearing in such shows as Tiny Toon Adventures, GI Joe, Attack of the Killer Tomatoes: The Animated Series, Taz-Mania, Where's Waldo, The Little Mermaid, Batman: The Animated Series, and Bonkers before landing perhaps his most recognized role in 1993 as The Brain on Animaniacs and later its spin-off show Pinky and the Brain. Following this, LaMarche worked on The Critic, Freakazoid!, and The Tick before then reprising his role of Egon in Extreme Ghostbusters. The stretch of two years after this saw LaMarche portray characters in such shows as Hey Arnold! as Big Bob Pataki, Queer Duck, and The Chimp Channel. During this time LaMarche would become the voice actor for Mortimer Mouse whom he would voice in the television series Mickey Mouse Works and Disney's House of Mouse. It was at this time, 1999, that LaMarche began work on Futurama, and since Futurama, he has continued to work steadily in television, including guest roles on The Simpsons (where he once again parodied Orson Welles). His most recent regular role came as Hovis the butler on the Nickelodeon series Catscratch. LaMarche was the voice of antagonist Father in Codename: Kids Next Door and was also the voice of Victor in Playhouse Disney's Handy Manny 2007 Halloween episode.

LaMarche has done various voice work for many Warner Bros. Animation and DiC Entertainment cartoons. He also delivered the protracted belches for the "Great Wakkorotti" shorts on Animaniacs, in which Wakko Warner performed various pieces of music. In 2011, LaMarche reprised his role as Yosemite Sam in Cartoon Network's new series, The Looney Tunes Show, and its spin-off, New Looney Tunes.

LaMarche made several appearances in My Little Pony: Friendship Is Magic where he voiced Chancellor Neighsay.

Pinky and the Brain
LaMarche plays the character of The Brain in both Animaniacs and the spin-off. In creating the voice for Brain, LaMarche says he looked at a picture of the character and immediately thought of Orson Welles, although the character was not modeled after Welles. Voicing Brain gave LaMarche the opportunity to make use of his signature impersonation of Welles. Many Pinky and the Brain episodes are nods to Welles' career. LaMarche won an Annie Award for his role as the Brain, and was nominated for an Emmy. LaMarche would later use this accent to voice Father in Codename: Kids Next Door.

The Critic 
While working on The Critic, LaMarche once voiced 29 characters in one 30-minute episode.

His time on The Critic also afforded LaMarche the opportunity to once again parody Orson Welles, this time after a video reading of a will (the Sherman family was so wealthy, they had hired Welles to narrate it) dissolves into a commercial for Mrs. Pells Fishsticks, as well as another for Rosebud Frozen Peas ("full of count-ry goodness and green pea-ness"), and another for Blotto Bros. wine. He also occasionally served as an uncredited fill-in for main cast member Jon Lovitz as Jay Sherman.

Futurama

Much of his best known voice work is from Futurama where he voiced Zapp Brannigan's beleaguered assistant Kif Kroker, melodramatic soap acting unit Calculon, the Nero-esque Hedonismbot, Morbo the news anchor, and Lrrr, ruler of the planet Omicron Persei 8, among numerous others. He has also done his Orson Welles impression on the show, winning a 2011 Outstanding Voice-Over Performance Emmy for his portrayal of Lrrr and Orson Welles in the episode "Lrrreconcilable Ndndifferences". He won another Emmy the following year for the episode "The Silence of the Clamps".

Heroes 
LaMarche acted, voice only, in the second episode of the hit NBC show Heroes, "Don't Look Back", as the villain Sylar. His voice is heard in a recorded phone conversation on Chandra Suresh's answering machine. The role of Sylar was later played by Zachary Quinto.

Film 
LaMarche appeared in many films, including dubbing the voice of Orson Welles over Vincent D'Onofrio's on-camera performance in Ed Wood; Pepé Le Pew in Space Jam; supplying the voice of the Alec Baldwin puppet in Team America: World Police, and reprising his roles from Queer Duck and Futurama in the direct-to-video films Queer Duck: The Movie and Futurama: Bender's Big Score, respectively.

His one on-camera theatrical film performance was in the 1981 Canadian feature Funny Farm, not to be confused with a later Chevy Chase vehicle of the same name. The film follows the story of a young standup comedian's attempt to break into the big-time on the L.A. comedy scene. LaMarche played Dickie Lyons, an impressionist who befriends the main character, Mark Champlin. The film also starred Howie Mandel, Eileen Brennan, and Miles Chapin.

In Mark Hamill's 2004 movie Comic Book: The Movie, LaMarche made a rare live appearance to be in the special features of the DVD alongside Pinky and the Brain co-star Rob Paulsen. Among other gags, he re-enacted his impression of Orson Welles' famous frozen peas commercial outtake.

Commercials 
LaMarche has also lent his voice to commercials. He voiced Kellogg's Froot Loops spokesbird Toucan Sam, the animated Willy Wonka character in Nestlé's Willy Wonka Candy Company commercials, and the narrator for Lexus commercials. He would also appear as himself, doing the voice of Popeye the Sailor for the Long John Silver's restaurant chain in the early 1990s, reprising the role from the TV series Popeye & Son.

On 8 September 2018 LaMarche was featured in the commercial for the upcoming open world driving game Forza Horizon 4.

Theme parks 
LaMarche provided the voice of Yosemite Sam for the Yosemite Sam and the Gold River Adventure! dark ride at Six Flags Over Texas, which opened in 1992.

Personal life 
LaMarche has been married to Robin G. Eisenman since May 19, 1991; together they have a son, Jonathan.

Filmography

Film

Animation

Video games

Live-action

Awards and nominations

References

External links 

 
 
 
 
 

1958 births
Living people
20th-century Canadian male actors
21st-century Canadian male actors
Annie Award winners
Audiobook narrators
Canadian expatriate male actors in the United States
Canadian impressionists (entertainers)
Canadian male film actors
Canadian male television actors
Canadian male video game actors
Canadian male voice actors
Canadian stand-up comedians
Comedians from Toronto
Franco-Ontarian people
Male actors from Toronto
Male actors from Los Angeles
Primetime Emmy Award winners
Disney people